Gottlieb Wehrle (March 14, 1822 – July 31, 1886) was an American farmer from Fennimore, Wisconsin who spent a single term as a Reform Party member of the Wisconsin State Assembly from the third Grant County district.

Background 
Wehrle was born in the Grand Duchy of Baden, Germany, on March 14, 1822. He received a common school education and became a farmer. He came to the United States on March 10, 1854, in steerage, having embarked in Le Havre, eventually moved to Wisconsin in 1855 and settled on a farm in Fennimore. Wehlre died in 1886 and was buried in Fennimore.

Public office 
He was twice elected chairman of the Fennimore town board, before being elected to the Assembly in 1873 on the Reform ticket (in the same election which brought William Robert Taylor to power), with 584 votes to 530 for Republican former Assemblyman Jonathan Baker Moore. (The incumbent, Republican John Monteith, was not a candidate for re-election.) He was assigned to the standing committee on education. 
 
In 1874 he sought re-election as a Democrat, but lost by 645 votes to 838 for former Republican Assemblyman Benjamin M. Coates.

Heritage 
The unincorporated community of Werley, Wisconsin was named after him.

References 

Farmers from Wisconsin
People from the Grand Duchy of Baden
People from Fennimore, Wisconsin
Wisconsin Reformers (19th century)
19th-century American politicians
1822 births
1886 deaths
Democratic Party members of the Wisconsin State Assembly